is a former international table tennis player from Japan.

Table tennis career
From 1971 to 1975 she won six medals in singles, doubles, and team events in the World Table Tennis Championships and seven medals in the Asian Table Tennis Championships.

Her six World Championship medals included a gold medal at the 1971 World Table Tennis Championships in the Corbillon Cup (women's team event) with Yasuko Konno, Toshiko Kowada and Emiko Ohba.

See also
 List of table tennis players
 List of World Table Tennis Championships medalists

References

Japanese female table tennis players
Asian Games medalists in table tennis
Table tennis players at the 1974 Asian Games
Medalists at the 1974 Asian Games
Asian Games silver medalists for Japan
Asian Games bronze medalists for Japan